Ceratina tanganyicensis, also known as Ceratina (Simioceratina) tanganyicensis, is a species of bee belonging to the family Apidae, subfamily Xylocopinae.

References

External links
 Patterns of bee diversity in Uganda
 Sri Lanka bees
 Animaldiversity.org

tanganyicensis
Insects described in 1911